Justin Isiah Che (born November 18, 2003) is an American professional soccer player who plays as a defender for Bundesliga club 1899 Hoffenheim, on loan from FC Dallas.

Club career

FC Dallas
Che joined the FC Dallas academy in 2009. During 2020, Che played with the FC Dallas USL League One affiliate side, North Texas SC, where he earned 2020 USL League One All-League Team honors at the end of the season. Che subsequently signed a homegrown player deal with FC Dallas on October 2, 2020.

Bayern Munich
On January 5, 2021, Che was one of six FC Dallas players who went on a three-week training stint with German Bundesliga side Bayern Munich. On February 12, he joined Bayern Munich II on loan. On June 15, it was announced that Che would return to FC Dallas.

Hoffenheim 
On January 21, 2022, it was announced Che had been loaned to Bundesliga club Hoffenheim from FC Dallas.  Che's loan to Hoffenheim is valid through June 30, 2023, at which point Hoffenheim has a purchase option in his contract.

International career
Che received his first call-up to the United States national team ahead of a friendly against Switzerland on May 20, 2021, but did not feature in the match.

Personal life

Justin Che was born in the United States to a Cameroonian father and a German-Russian mother. His mother was born in Russia but raised in Germany, where her parents currently reside, and both her father and mother have German citizenship. Justin holds a German as well as an American passport. He is eligible for the national teams of the United States, Cameroon, Russia, and Germany.

Honors
Individual
USL League One  All-League Team: 2020

References

External links
 
 
 Justin Che at FC Dallas

2003 births
Living people
People from Frisco, Texas
Soccer players from Texas
American soccer players
American people of Cameroonian descent
Sportspeople of Cameroonian descent
American people of Russian descent
American people of German descent
German people of Cameroonian descent
German people of Russian descent
Citizens of Germany through descent
Association football defenders
North Texas SC players
FC Dallas players
FC Bayern Munich II players
USL League One players
3. Liga players
Homegrown Players (MLS)
American expatriate soccer players
American expatriate soccer players in Germany
United States men's under-20 international soccer players
Major League Soccer players
TSG 1899 Hoffenheim players
Bundesliga players